Cedric Waegemans (born 26 December 1984) is a former professional Belgian darts player who currently played for the British Darts Organisation (BDO) events.

Career
Waegemans won the Belgium National Championship in 2013. Apart from this he has only made one quarter-final appearance in WDF ranked events, in the 2012 Luxembourg Open. He did however qualify for the 2015 BDO World Darts Championship, beating Jeroen Geerdink, Martin Atkins and Jermaine Wattimena en route in the playoff qualifiers in Hull, winning one of the four spots available. He defeated Eddy Sims 3-1 in the preliminary round before losing to Gary Robson 3-0 in the first round. Waegemans quit the BDO in 2019.

World Championship Results

BDO
 2015: 1st Round (lost to Gary Robson 0-3) (sets)

External links

Belgian darts players
Living people
1984 births
British Darts Organisation players